Hostages (Hebrew: בני ערובה; Bnei Aruba) is an Israeli drama television series that was first broadcast on Channel 10 in October 2013. The series was created by Rotem Shamir and Omri Givon and produced by Chaim Sharir.

Series overview 

{| class="wikitable" style="text-align: center;"
|-
! style="padding: 0 8px;" colspan="2" rowspan="2"| Season
! style="padding: 0 8px;" rowspan="2"| Episodes
! colspan="3"| Originally aired
|-
! First aired
! Last aired
! Network
|-
| style="background:#ADD8E6;"|
| [[List of Hostages (Israeli TV series) episodes#Season 1 (2015)|1]]
| 10
| 
| 
| rowspan="3"| Channel 10, Canal+
|-
| style="background:#FADFAD;"|
| [[List of Hostages (Israeli TV series) episodes#Season 2 (2016)|2]]
| 12
| 
| 
|-
| style="background:pink;"|
| [[List of Hostages (Israeli TV series) episodes#Season 3 (2017)|3]]
| TBA
| TBA
| TBA
|-
|}

Episodes

Season 1 (2015) 

When four masked men violently break into the Danon family home taking them hostage, the family of four will be shaken to the core and their lives changed forever.
The mysteriously masked men demand that Yael, the matriarch of this family and brilliant surgeon, kill the prime minister in what’s meant to be a routine surgery. 
The clock is ticking with the operation scheduled for the following day and if the Prime Minister is not dead, her family will be.

Season 2 (2016) 

Adam Rubin, an accomplished SWAT officer who has abducted the Prime Minister in order to save his wife's life, finds himself in the midst of a hostage situation, but this time it is him surrounded by large police forces, among them some of his best friends. 
Adam is stuck with the Prime Minister in an abandoned Yeshiva building on the outskirts of Jerusalem. His wife's medical condition is deteriorating, and he has to get out of there to save her life. He has no plan of action, and every moment passing sinks him deeper into quicksand. Even if he manages to extricate them from the trouble they're in, he will discover that the real troubles await him outside.

Season 3 (2017) 

Hostages has yet to be renewed for a third season.

References

External links 

 

Lists of Israeli drama television series episodes